Calvin Lewis Nicholas (born June 11, 1964) is a former American football wide receiver for the San Francisco 49ers of the National Football League (NFL). He was drafted by the 49ers in the eleventh round of the 1987 NFL Draft. Nicholas played college football at Grambling State University and attended McKinley Senior High School in Baton Rouge, Louisiana. He was a member of the San Francisco 49ers team that won Super Bowl XXIII.

References

External links
Just Sports Stats
Fanbase profile

Living people
1964 births
American football wide receivers
African-American players of American football
Grambling State Tigers football players
San Francisco 49ers players
Players of American football from Baton Rouge, Louisiana
21st-century African-American people
20th-century African-American sportspeople